The 1st Panzer Division is an armoured division of the German Army. Its headquarter is based in Oldenburg. In the course of the last reorganisation of the Bundeswehr it became the backbone of Germany's newly formed intervention forces with a manpower of 35,000 soldiers. The division is equipped and trained for high intensity combat operations against militarily organized enemies as well as peacekeeping missions. The majority of all German troops assigned to EU-Battlegroups and Nato Response Forces will come from this division. It also represents Germany's permanent contribution to the binational I. German/Dutch Corps.

The 43rd Mechanized Brigade of the Royal Netherlands Army is integrated into the 1st Panzer Division since 2019.

History
This division was formed on July 1, 1956, the day of the official inauguration of the Bundeswehr. It was the first fully operational unit of the new German Army.  
At first referred to as 1st Grenadier Division, it was reorganized in the 1980s and made fully armoured in 1981. 
During this period it was part of I Corps of the Bundeswehr Heer, in turn part of NATO's Northern Army Group, Allied Forces Central Europe.

1st Panzer Division has deployed to the Balkans, Afghanistan and to several peacekeeping operations. Troops of this division were also deployed to the support of civilian agencies during large natural disasters such as the Hamburg Floods of 1962, disastrous wild fires in Northern Germany in the 1970s and the 2002 Floods in Eastern Germany.

The division cultivates a partnership with the United States Army 28th Infantry Division.

In April 2019 the division headquarters took the role of exercise High Command (HICON) for Exercise "Allied Spirit X" at Hohenfels Training Area in Bavaria. The exercise lead is routinely rotated among coalition/NATO partners. The exercise primarily involved the 21st Panzer Brigade, the Lithuanian Iron Wolf Brigade, and their subordinate units; 5,630 participants from 15 nations took part. The division already had Dutch, British and Polish officers within its ranks. The US Army's 2nd Battalion, 34th Armored Regiment, took part in the exercise. Six engineering advisor teams from 1st Security Force Assistance Brigade provided hands-on experience and testing of secure communications between NATO allies and partners.

Structure July 2022 

  1st Panzer Division (1. Panzerdivision), in Oldenburg
  Staff and Signal Company 1st Panzer Division, in Oldenburg
  9th Panzerlehr Brigade (Panzerlehrbrigade 9), in Munster
  21st Panzer Brigade (Panzerbrigade 21), in Augustdorf
  41st Panzergrenadier Brigade (Panzergrenadierbrigade 41), in Neubrandenburg
  43rd Mechanized Brigade (43 Gemechaniseerde Brigade), in Havelte
  1st Operations Support Battalion (Unterstützungsbataillon Einsatz 1), in Oldenburg (Reserve unit)
  325th Artillery Demonstration Battalion (Artillerielehrbataillon 325), in Munster
  Signal Battalion 610 (Fernmeldebataillon 610), in Prenzlau (Operationally assigned to NATO's Multinational Corps Northeast)
  901st Heavy Engineer Battalion (Schweres Pionierbataillon 901), in Havelberg (Reserve unit)

Geographic Distribution

References

External links 
 Official website of Intervention Force Division / 1st Armoured Division

Military units and formations established in 1956
1
1956 establishments in Germany